Wynonna is the debut studio album of American country music artist of the same name. It was released in 1992 (see 1992 in country music) on MCA Records in association with Curb Records as her first solo debut album. Before the release of Wynonna, she recorded alongside her mother, Naomi, as The Judds, a duo which charted more than 20 country singles in the 1980s and early 1990s until hepatitis forced Naomi to retire.

Certified 5× Multi-Platinum in the U.S. for sales of five million copies, Wynonna produced three consecutive Number One hits on the Billboard Hot Country Singles & Tracks (now Hot Country Songs) charts in "She Is His Only Need", "I Saw the Light", and "No One Else on Earth", as well as a #4 in "My Strongest Weakness". "I Saw the Light" was also the Number One country song of 1992, according to Billboard.

"When I Reach the Place I'm Goin'" was later recorded by Patty Loveless for the 1994 compilation album Red Hot + Country and on her 2005 album Dreamin' My Dreams.

"It's Never Easy to Say Goodbye" was later recorded by Kenny Chesney on his 1996 album Me and You.

Track listing

Personnel 
As listed in liner notes.

 Wynonna Judd – lead vocals, backing vocals (2, 5, 8)
 John Barlow Jarvis – keyboards (1, 9)
 Steve Nathan – keyboards (2, 3, 4, 6, 8, 9)
 Matt Rollings – keyboards (2, 3, 4, 6, 7, 8)
 Barry Beckett – keyboards (7)
 Paul Kennerley – all instruments (10), backing vocals (10)
 George Marinelli – electric guitar (1, 9)
 Don Potter – acoustic guitar (1-5, 7-9), MIDI acoustic guitar (5), electric guitar (6)
 Steuart Smith – acoustic guitar (1, 5, 9), electric guitar (1-4, 6-8)
 Sam Bush – mandolin (7, 9)
 Marty Stuart – electric guitar (8)
 Leland Sklar – bass (1, 9)
 Willie Weeks – bass (2-8)
 Rick Marotta – drums (1, 9)
 Eddie Bayers – drums (2-8)
 Dave Loggins – backing vocals (2)
 Judy Rodman – backing vocals (2)
 Andrew Gold – backing vocals (3)
 Naomi Judd – backing vocals (5)
 John Cowan – backing vocals (6)
 Jonell Mosser – backing vocals (6, 8)
 Gary Chapman – backing vocals (7)
 Donna McElroy – backing vocals (7)

Production 
 Producers – Tony Brown (Tracks #1-9) and Paul Kennerley (Track #10).
 Associate Producer – Don Potter 
 Recorded by Chuck Ainlay, Paul Kennerley and Steve Tillisch.
 Second Engineers – Jeff Coppage, Karen Eckhoff, Jason Garner, Mel Jones, Russ Martin and Craig White.
 Overdubs recorded by Chuck Ainlay, Brad Gilderman and Russ Martin.
 Recorded at Emerald Sound Studio, 16th Avenue Sound and Backstage Studio (Nashville, TN).
 Track #10 recorded at Paul Kennerley's house
 Mixed by Chuck Ainlay
 Mastered by Chuck Ainlay and Denny Purcell at Georgetown Masters (Nashville, TN).
 Project Coordinator – Jessie Noble
 Art Direction and Design – Team Design, Inc. 
 Hand Lettering – Andy Engel
 Photography – Peter Nash
 Director of Creative Services – Jim Kemp
 Hair – Earl Cox/Trumps
 Make-up – Mary Beth Felts
 Styling – Vanessa Ware

Charts and certification

References

1992 debut albums
Albums produced by Tony Brown (record producer)
Curb Records albums
MCA Records albums
Wynonna Judd albums